Alompra is a genus of moths in the family Lasiocampidae. The genus was erected by Frederic Moore in 1872.

Species
Alompra bidiensis Tams, 1953
Alompra cerastes Tams, 1953
Alompra ferruginea Moore, 1872
Alompra roepkei Tams, 1953
Alompra yibinfani

References

Lasiocampidae
Moth genera